The Voice: Ahla Sawt is the Arabic version of Dutch show The Voice of Holland created by John de Mol and produced by Talpa Media Group. The first season of MENA's version of The Voice debuted on 14 September 2012 and was broadcast worldwide from Beirut, Lebanon via MBC 1, a pan-Arabian television station. Through an agreement, the show was also simulcast via LBCI's channels. The first two season's main host was Egyptian actor Mohammad Kareem and Arwa Gouda. Nadine Wilson Njeim hosted from backstage.

The format of The Voice: Ahla Sawt has three stages, which are the blind auditions, the battle rounds, and the live performances. In the blind auditions, each contestant will be allowed to sing for 90 seconds with each of the coaches having their backs to the singer. When a coach wants a singer on their team, the coach presses a red button that results in the chair being turned around to reveal who the singer is to that coach and the singer joining their team. If two or more coaches turn around for that singer, the singer gets to decide which team they want to join. Each coach will have to select 12 singers to form their team from a group of 100 contestants.

Once the blind auditions finish, the battle rounds will begin where the coaches will pair two singers on each team to compete against each other singing the same song on stage. The coaches will then have to decide which contestant will stay and which will be eliminated. After a series of eliminations, live performances will occur where the public can decide which singer will represent the Arab World as "The Voice".

The winner of season 1 of The Voice Ahla Sawt was Murad Bouriki from Team Assi who received the highest number of votes beating out Yousra Mahnouch, Farid Ghannam, and Qusai Hatem.

Due to the high ratings and big popularity the series got in the Arab World, MBC renewed the show for a second season which aired in 2013. All 4 coaches of season 1 came back for season 2. The second season premiered on Saturday, 28 December 2013.

The Voice: Ahla Sawt seasons 1 and 2 were produced by Sony Pictures Television Arabia for MBC and Season 3 was produced by Talpa Middle East.

In season two, during an intense finale which drew millions of viewers across the Middle East & North Africa, guest star Ricky Martin took the stage to perform his new songs "Adrenalina" and "Come With Me". Iraq's Sattar Saad from Team Kadim won the title after receiving the highest number of votes beating out Iraq's Simor Jalal, Egypt's Wahm and Syria's Hala Al Kaseer.

All four coaches once again returned for season three of The Voice Ahla Sawt, which started airing on MBC on 26 September 2015. On 26 December 2015, the winner of season three was Jordan's Nedaa Sharara from Team Sherine who beat out Lebanon's Christine Said from Team Kadim, Iraq's Ali Yousef from Team Assi, and Tunisia's Hamza Fadlaoui from Team Saber.

In 2015, a spin-off of the show featuring children as contestants debuted under the title The Voice Kids – Ahla Sawt.

In 2018, there was a change in the judging panel. The season 4 judges were Elissa, Mohamed Hamaki, Assi El Helani (who had not been replaced since season 1) and Ahlam. The title was won by Iraqi contestant Doumou' Tahseen from Team Ahlam.

The first episode of the fifth season was broadcast on 21 September 2019. In addition to previous coaches Ahlam and Hamaki, the season saw two new coaches: Moroccan singer Samira Said and Lebanese popstar Ragheb Alama, the latter of whom had the winner team this season.

The Voice coaches

Coaches' timeline 

 Kadim Al Sahir – Iraqi composer-musician, singer and poet
 Sherine – Egyptian pop star and actress
 Assi El Helani – Lebanese singer
 Saber Rebaï – Tunisian composer-musician
 Elissa – Lebanese singer
 Ahlam – Emirati singer
 Mohamed Hamaki – Egyptian singer
 Ragheb Alama – Lebanese singer
 Samira Said – Moroccan pop singer

Series overview
Color key
  Team Kadim  
  Team Sherine
  Team Saber 
  Team Assi 
  Team Mohamed 
  Team Ahlam
  Team Elissa 
 Team Ragheb 
 Team Samira

The Voice finalists 
Color key
 – Winning coach and their team. 
Winners are in bold, finalists in finale listed first, eliminated artists are in small font.

References

External links 
 

Arab world
2012 Lebanese television series debuts
2010s Lebanese television series
Lebanese Broadcasting Corporation International original programming